XHTRR-FM is a commercial radio station located in Torreón, Coahuila, broadcasting to the Comarca Lagunera area on 92.3 FM. XHTRR airs a regional Mexican music format branded as "La Caliente".

History
XHTRR received its concession on November 30, 1990, and signed on in 1993. It was originally owned by Radio Fama, S.A. de C.V.

References

External links
Multimedios website

Radio stations in Coahuila
Regional Mexican radio stations
Mass media in Torreón
Radio stations in the Comarca Lagunera
Multimedios Radio